Yves Hézard (born 20 October 1948) is a French former professional road bicycle racer. His sporting career began with CSM Puteaux.

Major results

1969
 national Military Road Race Championship
1971
Vailly-sur-Sauldre
1972
Ambert
Four Days of Dunkirk
Ronde de Seignelay
Saussignac
Tour de France:
Winner stage 7
7th place overall classification
1975
Blois
Commentry
Vaily-sur-Sauldre
1976
Angerville
Chateau-Chinon
1977
 national track pursuit championship
1978
Mende
Ronde de Seignelay
Grand Prix de Fourmies
1980
Paris–Bourges
Chamalières
1981
Bourges

External links 

Official Tour de France results for Yves Hézard

References 

1948 births
Living people
Sportspeople from Nièvre
French male cyclists
French Tour de France stage winners
Cyclists from Bourgogne-Franche-Comté
20th-century French people
21st-century French people